Nije tebi do mene is the eleventh studio album by Serbian singer Dragana Mirković. It was released in 1994.

Track listing
Nije tebi do mene (We aren't meant to be)
Crni leptir (Black Butterfly)
Čarolija (Magic)
Nisam ni metar od tebe (I'm not even a meter away from you)
Varala bih, varala (I'd cheat and lie)
Ljubav je samo za heroje (Love is only meant for heroes)
Od kad sam se u tebe zaljubila (Ever since I fell in love with you)
Za mene si ti (You're the one for me)
Tugo mojih dana (My saddest days)
Opojni su zumbuli (Intoxicating Hyacinths)
Ljubav se meni dešava (Love is happening to me)
Kaži mi (Tell me)

References

1994 albums
Dragana Mirković albums